A night deity is a goddess or god in mythology associated with night, the night sky, or darkness. They commonly feature in polytheistic religions. The following is a list of night deities in various mythologies.

Arabian
 Al-Qaum, Nabatean god of war and the night, and guardian of caravans

Aztec
 Lords of the Night, a group of nine gods, each of whom ruled over a particular night
 Itzpapalotl, fearsome skeletal goddess of the stars
 Metztli, god or goddess of the moon, night, and farmers
 Tezcatlipoca, god of the night sky, the night winds, hurricanes, the north, the earth, obsidian, enmity, discord, rulership, divination, temptation, jaguars, sorcery, beauty, war, and strife
 Tzitzimimeh, skeletal goddesses of the stars
 Yohaulticetl, the lunar goddess known as the "Lady of the Night"

Canaanite
 Shalim, god of dusk
 Araphel, the divine darkness

Egyptian
 Apep, the serpent god, the deification of evil and darkness
 Kuk, uncreated god and the personification of the primordial darkness
 Khonsu, god of the moon
 Nut, goddess of the night also associated with rebirth

Greco-Roman 

Greek

 Achlys, a primordial goddess of the clouding of eyes after death, the eternal night, and poison
 Artemis, the goddess of the hunt, the wilderness, and wild animals, who was commonly associated with the moon
Astraeus, Titan god of the dusk, stars, planets, and the art of Astronomy and Astrology
 Asteria, Titan goddess of nocturnal oracles and the stars
 Erebus, the primordial god and personification of darkness
 Hades, god of the underworld, whose domain included night and darkness
 Hecate, the goddess of boundaries, crossroads, witchcraft, and ghosts, who was commonly associated with the moon
 Hypnos, the personification of sleep, the son of Nyx and Erebus and twin brother of Thanatos
 Nyx, a primordial goddess and personification of the night
 Selene, Titaness goddess and personification of the moon
 Thanatos, the personification of death, the son of Nyx and Erebus and twin brother of Hypnos

Roman
 Diana Trivia, goddess of the hunt, the moon, crossroads, equivalent to the Greek goddesses Artemis and Hecate
 Latona, mother goddess of day and night, equivalent to the Greek goddesses Leto and Asteria
 Luna, goddess of the moon, equivalent to the Greek goddess Selene
 Nox, primordial goddess of night; equivalent to the Greek goddess Nyx
 Scotus, primordial god of darkness; equivalent to the Greek god Erebus
 Somnus, god of sleep, equivalent to the Greek god Hypnos
 Summanus, god of nocturnal thunder

Etruscan
Artume (also called Aritimi, Artames, or Artumes), Etruscan goddess of the night; equivalent to the Greek goddess Artemis

Hindu
 Ratri, goddess of night
 Chandra, god of the moon
 Rahu, celestial deity of darkness and eclipse
 Bhairava, god of night, guardian of all 52 Shakti Peetha
 Kali, goddess of time
Dewi Ratih, Balinese goddess of the moon

Hurrian
 DINGIR.GE6 (reading uncertain), goddess representing the night and associated with dreaming

Persian
 Ahriman, god of darkness, night and evils

Lithuanian
 Aušrinė, goddess of the morning star
 Breksta, goddess of twilight and dreams, who protects people from sunset to sunrise
 Mėnuo, god of the moon
 Vakarė, goddess of the evening star
 Žvaigždės, goddesses of the stars and planets

Meitei/Sanamahism
 Sajik (Arietis)
 Thaba (Musca)
 Khongjom Nubi (Pleiades)
 Apaknga (Lunar mansions)
 Sachung Telheiba (A Orionis)
 Likla Saphaba (Orion)
 Chingcharoibi (G Geminorum)
 Chungshennubi (Cancer)
 Leipakpokpa (Mars)
 Yumsakeisa (Mercury)
 Sagolsen (Jupiter)
 Irai (Venus)
 Thangja (Saturn)
 Shakok (Uranus)
 Shamei (Neptune)

Norse
 Nótt, female personification of night

Polynesian
 Hine-nui-te-pō, goddess of night and death and the ruler of the underworld in Māori mythology
 Ira, sky goddess and mother of the stars
 Taonoui, Māʻohi goddess who was the mother of the stars

Slavic
 Zorya, two guardian goddesses, representing the morning and evening stars
 Chernobog, g​od of ​darkness, ​c​haos, ​f​amine, pain, and all that is evil

See also
Chthonic (underworld) deities
Lists of deities in Sanamahism

 
Night